Ralph B. Clark Regional Park is an urban park located in the cities of Fullerton and Buena Park, California. The park is maintained by Orange County Regional Parks, the government division that controls the regional parks in Orange County. The park is south of Rosecrans Avenue at the southern edge of the West Coyote Hills in Buena Park, but both a small section named Camel Hill next to the main park area south of Rosecrans and another small section of the park with six softball fields and a trail located north of Rosecrans Avenue are within Fullerton city limits. The park was originally opened as Los Coyotes Regional Park in 1981, and was renamed in 1987 after then-retiring Orange County Supervisor Ralph B. Clark
(1917–2009).

Park facilities and activities
Amphitheater, barbecues, baseball/softball fields, bicycling, fire rings, fishing, group picnic areas, hiking trails, horseshoe pits, Interpretive Center, interpretive programs, model sail boating, picnic tables, picnic shelters, playground equipment, tennis courts, volleyball courts.

Interpretive center
The interpretive center is a small museum which features ice age fossil and local geology exhibits. The small, curated museum is open Tuesday and Saturday 10am-2pm.

The center has an mural of ice age mammals by Mark Hallet.

Among the fossils on display is a 9-million-year-old baleen whale skeleton that was recovered from a local construction site.  It is reputed to be one of the only complete Miocene whale fossils in existence.

Trails
The park has a pleasant tree shaded trail that runs about  along its periphery (including a  walk along the north edge of the park).

The trail rises to the top of Camel Hill (located in the north east corner of the park).  Sights from the top of Camel Hill include Catalina Island, the Long Beach port, Signal Hill, Palos Verdes Peninsula, the KFI radio tower, Hawks Point Bluff, Mount Baldy, the Los Coyotes Country Club, the Santa Ana Mountains and the Huntington Beach Power Plant structures.

Nearby Trails
The trail head for the Emery Ranch Trail lies just to the west of the portion of the park which is north of Rosecrans Avenue.  This is a somewhat steep  trail that winds its way up through the local coastal sage scrub plant community.  The trail ends at the peak of the hill near a water storage tank.

These trails are part of the Fullerton loop, a popular mountain biking route.

Wildlife
The park has a surprising variety of wildlife, given its small size.  More than 130 species of birds have been sighted in the park and there are resident populations of squirrels, rabbits, fish, lizards and turtles.  In the evening, just after sundown, bats can be seen feeding on the insects that fly over the pond.  On occasion coyotes, raccoons and opossums visit the park.

Fishing
The pond is stocked with catfish and trout.  In addition, there is a resident population of Largemouth bass and bluegill.  Catch and release rules apply to the bass.

Fishing licenses are required for people sixteen years and older.

Gallery

References

External links

 Official Ralph B. Clark Regional Park website
 Map of the park
 LA Times: Article about the recovery of the whale skeleton on display in the museum

Parks in Orange County, California
Buena Park, California
Tourist attractions in Fullerton, California
Geography of Fullerton, California
Regional parks in California
Museums in Orange County, California
Fossil museums
Natural history museums in California
Paleontology in California